Newsweek Views the News (also known as Newsweek Analysis) is an American television program broadcast Mondays at 8pm ET on the DuMont Television Network. The series ran from 1948 to 1950.

Overview
The series is a public affairs program hosted by Ernest K. Lindley. Editors of Newsweek magazine interviewed guests and discussed current news events.

The program, produced and distributed by DuMont, aired live on Monday nights from 8–8:30 p.m. on most DuMont affiliates. The last episode was aired on May 22, 1950, and DuMont replaced the series with Visit with the Armed Forces.

Episode status
Kinescopes of two episodes, "Casebook of Treason" (February 27, 1950) and "The Far East" (April 17, 1950), are in the collection of the UCLA Film and Television Archive.

"Casebook on Treason" featured ex-Soviet spies Whittaker Chambers and Hede Massing and Soviet defector Peter Pirogov as speakers.

See also
List of programs broadcast by the DuMont Television Network
List of surviving DuMont Television Network broadcasts
1949-50 United States network television schedule

References

Bibliography
David Weinstein, The Forgotten Network: DuMont and the Birth of American Television (Philadelphia: Temple University Press, 2004) 
Alex McNeil, Total Television, Fourth edition (New York: Penguin Books, 1980) 
Tim Brooks and Earle Marsh, The Complete Directory to Prime Time Network TV Shows, Third edition (New York: Ballantine Books, 1964)

External links

DuMont historical website

1948 American television series debuts
1950 American television series endings
1940s American television news shows
1950s American television news shows
American television talk shows
Black-and-white American television shows
English-language television shows
Newsweek
DuMont news programming